Edison Field may refer to:

 Edison Field (Anaheim), now Angel Stadium
 Edison Oil Field, Kern County, California